Ściborzyce can refer to following locations in Poland:

 Ściborzyce, Lesser Poland Voivodeship
 Ściborzyce Małe
 Ściborzyce Wielkie